Clinton County is located in the U.S. state of Illinois. At the 2020 census, the population was 37,762. Its county seat is Carlyle.

In 1960, the United States Census Bureau placed the mean center of U.S. population in Clinton County.

Clinton County is part of the St. Louis, MO-IL Metropolitan Statistical Area.

History

In 1805, prior to the establishment of the county, the territorial government established a post road from its capital (Vincennes, Indiana) to St. Louis, Missouri, passing through the county.
In 1808 a wagon road was laid out through the future Clinton County. It extended from the Goshen Settlement to the Ohio salt works and crossed the Kaskaskia River at Carlyle.

Clinton County was created on 27 December 1824, from portions of Washington, Fayette, and Bond Counties. It was named for the seventh Governor of New York, DeWitt Clinton, who helped build the Erie Canal.

Crossing the Kaskaskia became much easier when the bridge now known as the General Dean Suspension Bridge was built in 1859, at a cost of $40,000. Before the bridge was constructed, crossings involved a ferry or a mud bridge. The Illinois General Assembly set aside $20,000 for bridge restoration in 1951, and in 1953 the bridge was named after William F. Dean.

Geography
Eldon Hazlet State Recreation Area and South Shore State Park are in Clinton County. Its southern border is the Kaskaskia River.

Climate and weather

Major highways

  Interstate 64
  US Route 50
  Illinois Route 127
  Illinois Route 160
  Illinois Route 161
  Illinois Route 177

Adjacent counties

 Bond County - north
 Fayette County - northeast
 Madison County - northwest
 Marion County - east
 St. Clair County - west
 Washington County - south

Demographics

As of the 2010 United States Census, there were 37,762 people, 14,005 households, and 9,760 families residing in the county. The racial makeup of the county was 93.4% white, 3.5% black or African American, 0.4% Asian, 0.2% American Indian, 1.2% from other races, and 1.1% from two or more races. Those of Hispanic or Latino origin made up 2.8% of the population. In terms of ancestry, 54.8% were German, 9.8% were Irish, 5.8% were English, and 5.6% were American.

Of the 14,005 households, 32.7% had children under the age of 18 living with them, 56.5% were married couples living together, 8.7% had a female householder with no husband present, 30.3% were non-families, and 25.1% of all households were made up of individuals. The average household size was 2.55 and the average family size was 3.02. The median age was 39.3 years.

The median income for a household in the county was $55,278 and the median income for a family was $66,682. Males had a median income of $45,119 versus $34,051 for females. The per capita income for the county was $25,392. About 5.2% of families and 7.8% of the population were below the poverty line, including 9.2% of those under age 18 and 5.7% of those age 65 or over.

Education

 Carlyle Community Unit School District 1
 Patoka Community Unit School District 100
 Sandoval Community Unit School District 501
 Wesclin Community Unit School District 3
 Central Community High School, Breese
 Mater Dei Catholic High School, Breese

Communities

Cities

 Breese
 Carlyle
 Centralia (part)
 Trenton
 Wamac (part)

Villages

 Albers
 Aviston
 Bartelso
 Beckemeyer   
 Damiansville
 Germantown
 Hoffman
 Huey
 Keyesport (part)
 New Baden (part)
 Saint Rose
 Shattuc

Townships

 Breese
 Brookside     
 Carlyle
 Clement
 Germantown
 Irishtown
 Lake
 Looking Glass
 Meridian
 Saint Rose
 Santa Fe
 Sugar Creek
 Wade
 Wheatfield

Unincorporated Communities

 Boulder
 Ferrin
 Harbor Light Bay
 Jamestown
 Marydale
 New Memphis
 New Memphis Station
 North Harbor
 Panorama Hills
 Posey
 Royal Lake Resort
 Shattuc
 Snearlyille
 Stottletown
 Wertenberg

Politics
As part of German Catholic Central Illinois, nineteenth-century Clinton County was opposed to the “Yankee” Civil War and the Northern Illinois residents who supported it and the Republican Party. Consequently, the county was solidly Democratic for the six decades after the Civil War, turning Republican only due to opposition to Woodrow Wilson’s post-World War I policies towards Germany. Its first flirt with Republicanism was short-lived: in 1924 Clinton was the nation's southeasternmost county – and the solitary one in Illinois – to give a plurality to Robert M. La Follette, and in 1928 its residents voted powerfully for coreligionist Al Smith despite a landslide loss nationally.

1936, despite a landslide win for Franklin D. Roosevelt, saw Clinton County, like many other German Catholic counties in the Midwest, show a more permanent trend away from the Democratic Party: owing to a strong vote for Union Party candidate William Lemke, Roosevelt only won a plurality, and with powerful local opposition to World War II Wendell Willkie and Thomas E. Dewey won over 62 percent of the county's vote in the two elections held whilst World War II was in progress. Since then only Catholic John F. Kennedy and Lyndon B. Johnson during his 1964 landslide have obtained a majority in the county for the Democratic Party, although Bill Clinton did win pluralities in both 1992 and 1996.

See also
 National Register of Historic Places listings in Clinton County, Illinois

References
Specific

General

 United States Census Bureau 2007 TIGER/Line Shapefiles
 United States Board on Geographic Names (GNIS)
 United States National Atlas

External links
 
 
 Clinton County IL Genealogy Web Project

 
1824 establishments in Illinois
Illinois counties
Southern Illinois
Metro East
Populated places established in 1824